Race 2  is a 2013 Indian Hindi-language action crime film directed by Abbas–Mustan and written by Kiran Kotrial and Shiraz Ahmed. The film was produced by Ramesh S. Taurani under the Tips Industries banner, with UTV Motion Pictures serving as distributor and presenter. A sequel to the 2008 film, Race and the second installment of the Race film series, the film stars Saif Ali Khan, John Abraham, Deepika Padukone, Anil Kapoor, Jacqueline Fernandez, Bipasha Basu and Ameesha Patel. The music of the film is composed by Pritam, Yo Yo Honey Singh and Salim–Sulaiman. The film was dubbed in Tamil and Telugu.

The film received mixed to positive reviews from critics and audience. It grossed ₹161 crore worldwide and was deemed as a "Super Hit" .

Plot 
  
In Cyprus, a contract killer blasts a yellow Lamborghini Gallardo by shooting that car's petrol tank.

Some months later, a robbery takes place and European printing plates are stolen. Businessman Ranvir Singh meets a casino owner, Vikram Thapar, claiming to have been behind the robbery. He offers Thapar €1500  million in counterfeit currency in exchange for €500  million in real banknotes. Thapar agrees and borrows the €500  million from Armaan Malik, who is a dreaded crime boss and the leader of the powerful Turkish mafia. It is then revealed that Ranvir never stole the printing plates, and was cheating Thapar. Unable to return Armaan's money, Thapar is forced to give control of his five casinos in Istanbul, Turkey (as per the agreement the two men struck).

The cheating is a plan that Ranvir made a week earlier with Armaan, who he met through Ranveer's childhood friend Inspector Robert "RD" D'Costa, and his dim-witted assistant Cherry. Ranvir provides Thapar's casinos for €500 million to Armaan by taking 10% from it. They both become friends and partners. Ranvir meets Armaan's younger sister Aleena, who is also Armaan's 50% shareholder, and gradually becomes attracted to her.

Ranvir sees a picture of his deceased wife Sonia in Armaan's girlfriend Omisha's wallet and begins to woo her in order to gain her confidence. One day, RD points out Ranvir helping Armaan to become even wealthier. Ranvir states that he is trying to bankrupt Armaan as Armaan and Thapar were responsible for Sonia's death.

He begins his narration: Ranvir and a pregnant Sonia were in Cyprus, where Sonia's sister Tanya calls them to meet her in Bangkok. On the way, Ranvir tells Sonia that before going to Bangkok, he wants to transfer some savings from the bank. Unaware of a contract killer lurking around to kill Sonia, Ranvir asks her to sit in the car as he heads for the bank. Armaan's assassin successfully shoots the car's fuel tank (the Lamborghini car blasting scene at the beginning of the film), where Sonia dies. Ranvir chased the assassin and killed him by burning his car with cigarette lighter. Ranvir also tells RD that Sonia's body is in the morgue, and he will not bury Sonia until he bankrupts Armaan. Omisha tells him that she is Sonia's sister Tanya Martin.

Ranvir schemes to sell the Shroud of Turin and sell it to Armaan. After that, he will steal both the shroud and Armaan's wealth. However, RD, who is afraid of Armaan, betrays Ranvir and tells the truth to Armaan, who asks to give 15 billion euros to Armaan's old friend, godfather Anza, as an investment. Armaan also has to win a fight against the fighter Typhoon.

Aleena reveals Armaan was the one who planted a bomb in her car to kill her, and decides to help Ranvir. Ranvir steals the shroud while Armaan wins his fight against Typhoon. During the celebration, Aleena poisons Ranvir's glass. As he slowly dies, Armaan reveals that through RD, he knew his plan and Aleena was never on Ranvir's side. Omisha is also on Armaan's side and is not Sonia's sister. After Ranvir dies, Armaan and Omisha retrieve the shroud and leave in their private jet. Armaan points his gun at Aleena, revealing that he had been planning to kill her to take her share of the money. Unexpectedly, Ranvir crashes through the wall; Aleena never poisoned his drink. Aleena tells Armaan that she is on Ranvir's side, well aware of the fact that Armaan was attempting to kill her. Ranvir reveals that RD never betrayed him and that he himself told RD to inform Armaan of the real plan, making the latter think he was ahead of Ranvir.

Ranvir and Armaan have an intense combat in the malfunctioning private jet. Armaan tells Ranvir that he killed Sonia because she fled away with his money. He shoots the pilot and escapes with Omisha with a parachute, leaving Ranvir and Aleena to die in the resulting plane crash. However, the two manage to escape using Armaan's Audi R8 sports car, which floats on four attached parachutes. Armaan and Omisha hand over the shroud to Anza. On inspection, it is revealed to be fake. When Anza asks for his bearer bonds, they are also fake. Ranvir calls Armaan and taunts him that he is will be no less different than a beggar. It is also revealed that Anza is secretly helping Ranvir and Armaan is forced to hand over his properties, while Omisha dumps him for Anza. After being bankrupt, Armaan vows vengeance on Ranvir.

Ranvir visits Sonia's grave with Aleena and gives RD's share of money. When RD asks about the real shroud, he reveals that he never stole the shroud; it is still in the church. Aleena had switched the real bearer bonds while he and Armaan were fighting on the plane. RD admits that he does not want to risk his life again and makes Ranvir promise to never meet him again. Ranvir warns RD that promises are made to be broken, as the latter walks away.

The film ends with Ranvir and Aleena leaving Turkey for an unknown location.

Cast 
Saif Ali Khan as Ranvir Singh
John Abraham as Armaan Malik
Deepika Padukone as Aleena Malik, Armaan's sister and Ranvir's girlfriend
Anil Kapoor as Inspector Robert D'Costa aka "RD", Ranvir's childhood friend
Jacqueline Fernandez as Omisha, Armaan's fiancée
Bipasha Basu as Sonia, Ranvir wife (guest appearance)
Ameesha Patel as Cherry, RD's assistant
Aditya Pancholi as Godfather Anza, Armaan's friend
Rajesh Khattar as Vikram Thappar, Armaan partner

Production and casting 

After the success of Race (2008), Ramesh Taurani registered Race 2 as a title and Abbas–Mustan said that they would go ahead with a sequel "if we get a script in place which is even better than the original." The screenplay and story was written by Shiraz Ahmed and Kiran Kotrial who also wrote Race. Saif Ali Khan and Anil Kapoor were the first to sign on in November 2009 and were reported to be the only returning cast members from the first film. In June 2010, John Abraham was signed on to play the antagonist and Kareena Kapoor and Priyanka Chopra were approached to co-star opposite Khan and Abraham respectively. However, Kapoor turned down the role as she didn't want her pairing with Khan to get repetitive; Chopra opted out due to scheduling conflicts. It was also rumoured that Asin Thottumkal had been shortlisted to star alongside Khan; however Padukone was cast. In December 2010, Sonakshi Sinha was cast as a replacement for Priyanka. Chitrangda Singh was approached for a role opposite Anil Kapoor in May 2011 but eventually dropped out for unspecified reasons. Ameesha Patel and Mallika Sherawat were considered for that same role, but it ultimately went to Patel.

The film's shooting was set to begin on 5 October 2011 but was postponed to accommodate Deepika Padukone's dates causing scheduling conflicts with Sonakshi Sinha. Sinha's dates conflicted with her filming schedule for Dabangg 2 (2012), forcing her to drop out. In October 2011, Jacqueline Fernandez who had opted out of Krrish 3 (2013) and Raaz 3 (2012) was cast as a replacement for Sinha. Shortly afterwards, it was announced that Bipasha Basu would be reprising her role as Sonia in a cameo appearance and continuing to be role of Khan's wife. Despite rumours suggesting that Bipasha would be sharing screen space with ex-boyfriend John Abraham for the first time after their break-up, but John denied this. Reports have said that after this statement was said Abraham then told Saif that he didn't want to work with Bipasha in the first place. Jamiat Ulama-i-Hind, the largest of Sunni clerics in India, urged PM Manmohan Singh to stop their publication and display of Race 2 posters that featured verses from the Quran.

Filming 
The first Indian schedule began on 5 November 2011 in Mumbai for 15 days, wrapping up on 20 November. Meanwhile, Sanjay Dutt was in talks to join the cast, but he dropped out due to scheduling conflicts. The second schedule commenced on 23 January 2012 in Mumbai. Padukone dropped out within six days because the film was always being rescheduled.

Race 2'''s producer Ramesh Taurani released a statement to the media deeming Padukone's behaviour as "unethical, unprofessional and unacceptable". Also, it was reported that Asin was offered the role to replace Padukone, although it has been rumoured that she declined the offer, thus avoiding any controversies regarding her and Kapoor. However, Padukone and Taurani agreed on a settlement after much negotiation and the filming continued as planned. Fernandez, Abraham and Padukone joined the cast in May at Istanbul for the third schedule. On 7 October 2012, the shooting was completed. The Mardan Palace in Turkey was the setting for many scenes where it was shown as the home of Padukone and Abraham's characters.

 Soundtrack 
The soundtrack of Race 2 which is composed by Pritam and Yo Yo Honey Singh features 10 tracks, with four remix versions an unplugged version and a mashup of all the tracks. It was released on 11 January 2013. The film score is composed by Salim–Sulaiman.

The songs "Lat Lag Gayee", "Be Intehaan," and "Party on My Mind" became extremely popular and were declared as chartbusters. The song "Lat Lag Gayee" was choreographed by Karishma Chavan.

 Track listing 

 Reception 
The soundtrack received positive critical reception. IBN Live gave it 4/5 stars saying, "Race 2's soundtrack is racy to the core. In a nutshell, the album is bound to be a hit. Let's just hope the movie is as good as the soundtrack is!" Shresht Poddar, of Score magazine, gave the album 3/5 stars saying, "Personally, as a standalone album with no biases, it is enjoyable, but it could have done with better lyrics. The tracks are foot-tapping, and they would appeal to the masses. But if you compare it to Race, the album undoubtedly falls flat."

 Release Race 2 was released in 3200 screens in India; it is the third biggest release ever for a Hindi film after Ek Tha Tiger (2012) (3300 screens) and Dabangg 2 (2012) (3700 screens). Race 2 was released in more than 50 countries, including US, UK, Gulf, Australia, Pakistan as well as non-traditional markets like Maldives, East Timor, Myanmar, Morocco and Vietnam (with as many as seven screens). The film had a simultaneous release in Morocco in four to five screens, including theatres in Casablanca and Marrakech. Race 2 is subtitled in Arabic, Thai, Indonesian, Malay, Vietnamese, and Dutch.

 Critical reception Race 2 received mixed to positive reviews from critics and audience.

Madhureeta Mukherjee of The Times of India rated the film 3 out of 5, while commenting, "Mass dialogue delivery, heists, fully anti-hero characters, glamorous and sexy heroines, roulette, luxury and exotic cars, gizmos, and gangs – Director duo, Abbas-Mustan have thrown in everything with pompous grandeur, save for a riveting plot that shocks or stuns." Rubina A Khan of The First Post gave it 3 out of 5 stars, adding, "Race 2 delivers what it promises – good looking and anti hero ensemble cast, exotic locations, luxurious cars, bomb squads, revenge, lust and love, a couple of good and preppy style music tracks and, most importantly, a plot which opens a thrilling pace." Shivesh Kumar of IndiaWeekly awarded the movie 3.8 out of 5 stars.

Taran Adarsh of Bollywood Hungama gave 4 out of 5 stars and said "The writing isn't watertight, the film lacks a hit score, the climax is far from effective and overall, Race 2 pales in comparison to Race." Rajeev Masand of CNN-IBN awarded it a score of 3.5 out of 5 while commenting "The film has no intellectual pretensions; its only ambition is to offer a good time. In that, it mostly succeeds." Anupama Chopra of Hindustantimes gave 4.8 out of 5, reviewing, "Race 2 is essentially a big-budget film in which coolness is all. The director duo Abbas–Mustan have no pretensions about what they are making – full-on masala with a dash of revenge, a slice of heist and characters who are either strutting their chiseled bodies in slow motion or betraying each other." Saibal Chatterjee of NDTV gave it a score of 4.5 out of 5 and feels "This is a movie strictly for action who might be looking for a feverish two-and-a-half-hour ride that is far more giddy than heady."

 Box office 

 India Race 2 had what Box Office India called a "solid opening" at multiplexes and single screens with occupancy of around 60%–70%. The film had a very good opening day, netting . It showed good growth in its second day, collecting approximately  nett and became the fourth biggest Saturday collections ever. Race 2 dropped on Monday as it collected around  nett.

Race 2 did pretty well on its second Friday collecting around  nett. It collected around  nett in 10 days. It did well in its second week collecting around  nett. The two-week total was around  nett. It further added  in its third week. The movie as per Box Office India stands at over 1 billion in India.

 Overseas Race 2 had a good opening in overseas with approximately  the opening weekend. Race 2 grossed approximately $5.5 million overseas in ten days. After grossing $6 million in 17 days overseas, the film was declared a hit by Box Office India. Race 2 recorded similar figures in overseas markets like its prequel. Moreover, it recorded the highest ever collection in Pakistan for any Bollywood film with an amount of $775,000 beating Don 2 which netted $675,000. Its final business in the overseas market is around $6.5 million.

 Sequel 

After making two successful films, makers planned the third Installment of this series, which is unrelated to the first two films and will feature a whole new star cast, with the exception of Anil Kapoor and Jacqueline Fernandez. Salman Khan, Bobby Deol, and Daisy Shah were some of the new faces in the series and Remo D'Souza replaced Abbas–Mustan as the director of Race 3''. But, the film, which was released on 15 June 2018, received highly negative reviews from critics and audiences and is considered one of Bollywood's worst films.

Notes

References

External links 
 
 
 
 

2013 films
2010s Hindi-language films
Films directed by Abbas–Mustan
2013 action thriller films
Indian auto racing films
Indian horse racing films
Indian crime thriller films
Indian sequel films
Films featuring songs by Pritam
Films scored by Salim–Sulaiman
Indian detective films
UTV Motion Pictures films
Films shot in Istanbul
Films shot in Turkey
Indian action thriller films